Erich Butka (1 February 1944 – 20 August 2017) was an Austrian judoka. He competed in the men's heavyweight event at the 1972 Summer Olympics.

References

1944 births
2017 deaths
Austrian male judoka
Olympic judoka of Austria
Judoka at the 1972 Summer Olympics
Place of birth missing
20th-century Austrian people